Atkinson County is a county located in the southeastern portion of the U.S. state of Georgia. As of the 2020 census, the population was 8,286. The county seat is Pearson. The county was formed in 1917 from parts of Coffee and Clinch Counties. It is named for William Yates Atkinson, Democratic governor of Georgia from 1894 to 1898. In 2003 it had the highest illiteracy rate of any U.S. county at 36%.

Geography

The vast majority of Atkinson County is located in the Satilla River sub-basin of the St. Marys-Satilla River basin. The entire narrow western border area, in a line parallel to the western border and running through Willacoochee, is located in the Alapaha River sub-basin of the Suwannee River basin. A small southeastern corner of the county is located in the Upper Suwannee River sub-basin of the same Suwannee River basin.

Major highways

  U.S. Route 82
  U.S. Route 221
  U.S. Route 441
  State Route 31
  State Route 64
  State Route 89
  State Route 90
  State Route 135
  State Route 520

Adjacent counties
 Coffee County - north
 Ware County - east
 Clinch County - south
 Lanier County - southwest
 Berrien County - west

Demographics

2000 census
As of the census of 2000, there were 7,609 people, 2,717 households, and 1,980 families living in the county. The population density was 22 people per square mile (9/km2). There were 3,171 housing units at an average density of 9 per square mile (4/km2). The racial makeup of the county was 66.79% White, 19.61% Black or African American, 0.37% Native American, 0.12% Asian, 0.03% Pacific Islander, 12.03% from other races, and 1.06% from two or more races. 16.95% of the population were Hispanic or Latino of any race.

There were 2,717 households, out of which 38.80% had children under the age of 18 living with them, 55.10% were married couples living together, 12.80% had a female householder with no husband present, and 27.10% were non-families. 23.30% of all households were made up of individuals, and 9.10% had someone living alone who was 65 years of age or older. The average household size was 2.78 and the average family size was 3.27.

In the county the population was spread out, with 30.30% under the age of 18, 10.90% from 18 to 24, 29.60% from 25 to 44, 19.90% from 45 to 64, and 9.30% who were 65 years of age or older. The median age was 31 years. For every 100 females there were 98.00 males. For every 100 females age 18 and over, there were 97.40 males.

The median income for a household in the county was $26,470, and the median income for a family was $32,688. Males had a median income of $24,763 versus $18,434 for females. The per capita income for the county was $12,178. About 18.10% of families and 23.00% of the population were below the poverty line, including 27.10% of those under age 18 and 31.00% of those age 65 or over.

2010 census
As of the 2010 United States Census, there were 8,375 people, 2,983 households, and 2,159 families living in the county. The racial makeup of the county was 62.2% white, 17.3% black or African American, 0.6% American Indian, 0.3% Pacific islander, 0.3% Asian, 17.7% from other races, and 1.6% from two or more races. Those of Hispanic or Latino origin made up 24.3% of the population. In terms of ancestry, 16.1% were English, 16.0% were Irish, and 7.5% were American.

Of the 2,983 households, 41.2% had children under the age of 18 living with them, 50.3% were married couples living together, 15.3% had a female householder with no husband present, 27.6% were non-families, and 22.9% of all households were made up of individuals. The average household size was 2.80 and the average family size was 3.29. The median age was 33.4 years.

The median income for a household in the county was $33,834 and the median income for a family was $34,859. Males had a median income of $29,286 versus $25,705 for females. The per capita income for the county was $15,456. About 19.8% of families and 28.0% of the population were below the poverty line, including 42.4% of those under age 18 and 21.3% of those age 65 or over.

2020 census

As of the 2020 United States census, there were 8,286 people, 2,880 households, and 1,976 families residing in the county.

Education

The county is serviced along with Coffee County, Georgia by the Satilla Regional Library System.

Communities

Cities
 Pearson
 Willacoochee

Census-designated place
 Axson

Unincorporated communities
 Kirkland

Politics

See also

 National Register of Historic Places listings in Atkinson County, Georgia
List of counties in Georgia

References

External links
 list of places
 Atkinson County Sheriff's Office
 Atkinson County historical marker

 
1917 establishments in Georgia (U.S. state)
Populated places established in 1917
Georgia (U.S. state) counties